The New York Film Critics Circle Award for Best First Film is an award given by the New York Film Critics Circle, honoring gifted filmmakers through their first feature film.

Winners

1990s

2000s

2010s

2020s

See also
Independent Spirit Award for Best First Feature

References

Lists of films by award
New York Film Critics Circle Awards
Awards established in 1997
Directorial debut film awards